St Mary’s School is a private day school for girls in Colchester, Essex, England.
St Mary's is a member of the Girls' Schools Association and the Independent Association of Preparatory Schools.

Motto and Houses
The school's motto, Scientia et Veritas, translates from Latin as Knowledge and Truth.

St Mary's pupils are allocated to Houses for which they can gain house points to win various awards and trophies. The Houses
are named after some of the historical gates of Colchester:

 Abbeygate (green)
 Balkernegate (blue)
 Headgate (yellow)
 Scheregate (red)

History
St Mary’s School was opened in the summer of 1908 by sisters Miss May and Miss Lillian Billson at 15 Lexden Road, a house in St Mary's Terrace East. Since then the school has grown to 50 times its original size and become one of the foremost independent schools in the region.

St Mary's opened with just eight girls, five of whom had moved from Miss Walton's School in Inglis Road. Miss May taught six nine-year-old girls in the one classroom, using green collapsible desks, while Miss Lillian taught the other two girls in the dining room. The girls learnt English, History, Geography, French, Arithmetic, Geometry and Latin and in 1914 they sat their first public examination, the Junior Cambridge Exam.

St Mary's grew rapidly and by 1915 it had expanded at 17 Lexden Road. Basements were used as cloakrooms and the other floors were used as classrooms. The top two floors of 13 Lexden Road were acquired for boarders, while the remainder of the house was used as a surgery by Dr Fell. During the First World War, St Mary’s girls were encouraged to be patriotic, so much so that German lessons were discontinued and the girls instead helped provide boxes of fruit, eggs, cigarettes and other goodies for the wounded in the local military hospitals.

In 1923, the school bought new premises on Lexden Road, ‘Glen Mervyn’ - today's Senior School. Soon after buying the new building a gymnasium was built and the girls enjoyed learning to climb ropes and vault the horse! Miss May and Miss Lillian retired at Christmas 1934 and Miss Phyllis Comrie became the new Headmistress. During this time the number of girls attending the school continued to grow and the school flourished.

However, there was a decline in the number of pupils during the Second World War and when just seven girls were attending, the governors of the school began to insist that the school must close. Miss Comrie refused to allow this to happen and worked unpaid for a year in order to keep the school open.

Once the war was over, the number of girls attending the school grew again rapidly and extra space was needed. A nursery was established in a converted stable, the garage became an art room and the governors bought ‘Gostwycke’ in Cambridge Road, for the boarders.

In 1957, Miss Comrie retired after 23 years as Principal. She had maintained the high standards set by the previous headmistresses, the Billson sisters. The news of her retirement caused great sadness within the school community and many people believe the school owes a deep debt of gratitude to her. Indeed, without her leadership and tenacity of purpose during World War II, the school would not be here today.

References

Contact

External links
St. Mary's School
Profile on the ISC website

Schools in Colchester (town)
Private schools in Essex
Girls' schools in Essex
Educational institutions established in 1908
1908 establishments in England
Member schools of the Girls' Schools Association